Ian Gardiner may refer to:

 Ian Gardiner (footballer) (1928–1990), Scottish footballer
 Ian Gardiner (artist) (1943–2008), Australian artist
 Ian Gardiner (musician) (born 1952), bass player
 Ian Gardiner (rower), American rower who won a silver medal at the 1967 European Rowing Championships